Barry Rudolph is a recording engineer, mixing engineer, record producer and technical writer best known for his work with Rod Stewart, Lynyrd Skynyrd and Hall & Oates. He has been a contributing editor for Music Connection Magazine since 1987 and Mix Magazine since 1997. Rudolph is credited on more than 30 RIAA-certified gold and platinum records.

Early life and career 
Rudolph's interest in electronics started at a young age. While in sixth grade, he won a science fair for building a radio transmitter with parts from a war surplus store. In high school, Rudolph played the drums in a rock band and also designed and built a PA system for their use. He describes how his interest developed for recording engineering: "I was interested in what made certain records sound better to me and why".

He graduated with an Associate of Science Degree from Santa Ana College in 1969. A year later, he graduated California State University, Long Beach with a Bachelor of Science degree. Simultaneously, Rudolph worked for various Southern California aerospace and computer companies as a digital test technician.

His first job at a recording studio was as an assistant at United Audio in Orange County, California. In 1970, he moved to West Hollywood after accepting a position at Larrabee Sound Studios. Rudolph started cutting demo acetate discs and later assisted recording engineers during sessions. He was first engineer and mixer on his first #1 record, Al Wilson's album "Show and Tell" that received an RIAA gold certification in December 1973. Rudolph became a freelance engineer afterwards.

Rudolph started writing for Music Connection Magazine in 1987 and for Mix Magazine in 1997 and has been a regular contributor to both journals since. He started teaching audio engineering in 2010 at Pinnacle College in Alhambra, California and went on to teach at Musicians Institute in Hollywood, California. Rudolph is founder and owner of mixing facility Tones 4 $ Studios (pronounced "Tones For Dollars").

Selected discography

References

External Links
Barry Rudolph Interview NAMM Oral History Library (2021)

Living people
American audio engineers
Record producers from Los Angeles
Year of birth missing (living people)